Vehicle is the first full-length studio album by New Zealand group The Clean. It was released in 1990 by Flying Nun and Rough Trade Records. Much of the material was written for the band's reunion tour in the late 1980s. Rough Trade founder Geoff Travis offered to record The Clean after seeing them play in London, after which Vehicle was produced during a three-day session. The album was engineered by Ken Kennedy and notable producer Alan Moulder, who was suggested by Travis.

The front cover artwork is a painting by band member David Kilgour.

Critical reception

The New York Times wrote that "the guitar chords still tumble out with the grace of falling bricks, and the songs have an endearing buoyancy that results from the band's conscious rejection of precision."

Track listing
All songs written by David Kilgour, Hamish Kilgour, and Robert Scott.

Charts

References

External links

The Clean albums
Flying Nun Records albums
Rough Trade Records albums
1990 albums